Teaching As Leadership: The Highly Effective Teacher's Guide to Closing the Achievement Gap is a book by Steven Farr, Chief Knowledge Office at Teach For America, published by Jossey Bass in 2010. Farr and Teach For America share what the organization has learned about effective teachers over the last 20 years working to close the achievement gap. Based on this knowledge, the book outlines six principles that they believe will help teachers become leaders within the classroom, in particular, classrooms in low-income communities.

Teach For America

Teach For America is a Nonprofit organization that recruits top college graduates and professionals to commit to teach for two years in urban and rural schools across the United States.

Six Leadership Principles

Teaching as Leadership includes a framework that explains the traits of Teach For America's most successful teachers. This framework is categorized into six leadership principles:

Set Ambitious Goals for Student Achievement
Successful teachers in low-income communities set measurable goals for their students. Farr explains that these goals, along with strategies of investment, help both the students and teacher gain the motivation to overcome other obstacles and gain academic achievement.

Invest Students and Families in Working Hard to Achieve the Goals
According to the book, effective teachers work with students and their families to reverse low expectations that undermine a students ability to learn. "These teachers change students’ belief that intelligence is a fixed characteristic and show them that if they work hard enough, they will “get smart.”"

Plan Purposefully to Achieve the Vision of Student Success
Additionally, effective classroom leaders plan backwards with every mission they set forth on. These teachers ensure that every aspect of their work is built upon well-thought-out goals and effective strategies.

Execute Plans with Judgment and Adjustments
Teach For America states that "Strong classroom leaders are effective executors, making good judgments about when to follow through on their plans and when to adjust them in light of incoming data. They offer their students consistent, caring, demanding leadership, and constantly seek to maximize the time students have to work hard toward their goals."

Continuously Increase Effectiveness to Accelerate Student Learning
By critiquing their own work and constantly looking for new ways to improve their skills and leadership, effective teachers ensure that they are truly having an impact. These teachers use data to ensure that they are reaching their goals.

Work Relentlessly to Navigate Challenges
Finally, Teach For America states that "In many low-income communities, schools with the least capacity serve children with the greatest need. To make significant academic progress with students, highly effective teachers go above and beyond the traditional role of “teacher” and do whatever it takes to lead their students to academic success."

References

External links 
 [Teaching As Leadership: http://www.teachingasleadership.org]
[Teach For America: http://www.teachforamerica.org]

2010 non-fiction books
Books about education